Brian Levine (born 20 August 1958) is a former South African tennis player who played professional tennis from 1982 to 1988.

Career
In his career, Levine played in 24 Grand Slams (French Open, Wimbledon, US Open & Australian Open). Levine's first major grand slam was Wimbledon in 1983 where he qualified for the doubles with a 18-year-old Stefan Edberg. Levine competed in over 200 tournaments worldwide on the ATP Tour.

Levine won two doubles titles during his professional career. He reached his highest doubles ATP ranking on 24 March 1986 when he became the number 44 in the world. He won the singles title at the 1984 West Australian Open, a tournament on the Challenger Series held in Perth.

Career finals

Doubles (2  titles, 2 runner-ups)

References

External links
 
 

Living people
1958 births
Sportspeople from Cape Town
South African people of British-Jewish descent
South African Jews
South African male tennis players
Jewish tennis players
White South African people